Azzeddine Laraki ( ʻAz ud-Dīn al-ʻArāqī) (1 May 1929 – 1 February 2010) was a politician who served as Prime Minister of Morocco from 30 September 1986 to 11 August 1992. He was the 10th prime minister of Morocco and served under king Hassan II. He was Secretary General of the Organisation of the Islamic Conference (OIC) from 1997 to 2000. He was the first Moroccan official to hold that position.

Early life and education
He was born in Fes on 1 May 1929. He hails from the Musawid Nafis tribe in Karbala. His ancestor, 14th-century laureate and poet, Muhammad b. Abi al-Qasim b. al-Nafis al-Husayni al-Karbalaei, was the first to visit Morocco regularly, until he gained the epithet Laraki (trans. the Iraqi). He is mentioned by Ibn Battuta in his rihla.

He received his primary and secondary education in Fez before joining the Faculty of Medicine in Paris, from which he obtained his doctorate in 1957.

Career
A former hospital intern in Morocco and former deputy chief medical officer of the province of Oujda, Mr. Azeddine Laraki was appointed in 1958 to the post of director of the cabinet of the Minister of National Education and in 1959 director of the cabinet of the Minister of public health, then Director of Ibn Sina Hospital in Rabat, before his appointment in 1960 as Head of the Department of Thoracic Diseases and Surgery.

After having passed in December 1967 the competition of aggregation of medicine among the first Moroccan promotion, he became professor at the faculty of medicine and in 1972, professor holder of chair, member of several national and international scientific societies.

Laraki published several medical and literary researches inside and outside Morocco. He was a member of the Moroccan Writers Union and several national and international scientific societies. He was also a member in the Istiqlal Party, but then decided to disengage from the party and become individual.

Laraki served as the minister of education for nine years from 1976 to 1987 and as Prime Minister of Morocco from 30 September 1986 to 11 August 1992. During his term as education minister, he Arabicized the Moroccan education system. In October 1985, he was elected Vice-President of the 23rd General Conference of UNESCO, held in Sofia.

In January 1986, Mr. Laraki was elected President of the Executive Committee of the Arab Union for Physical Education and Sports, during the meeting in Rabat of the founding of this Union. On October 8 to October 10, Laraki had meetings with the President of the European Commission, Mr Jacques Delors, in the solemn opening of the session of the House of Representatives.

In August 1994, Hassan II appointed him chairman of the board of Al Akhawayn University in Ifrane. On December 12, 1996, he was elected Secretary General of the Organisation of Islamic Cooperation during the 24th Conference of Foreign Ministers meeting in Jakarta, then officially invested in December 1997 during the 8th Islamic Summit held in Tehran. He also served as an aggregate professor at Mohammed V University's the Faculty of Medicine, and a member of the Academy of the Kingdom of Morocco.

Death
Laraki died in Rabat, Morocco on 1 February 2010 at the age of 81.

References 

1929 births
2010 deaths
People from Fez, Morocco
Prime Ministers of Morocco
Government ministers of Morocco
Academic staff of Mohammed V University
Member of the Academy of the Kingdom of Morocco
Organisation of Islamic Cooperation officials